Maurice Andrieux (17 April 1925, in Hersin-Coupigny – 8 December 2008, in Toulouse) was a French communist politician.

Andrieux worked as a teacher and journalist. He served as editor-in-chief of Tribune des mineurs ('Miners' Tribune') in  Lens 1948-1951 and as secretary general of Ce Soir in Paris 1951–1953. Andrieux became mayor of Hersin-Coupigny in 1959. He was a member of parliament from the 10th constituency of Pas-de-Calais) between 1967 and 1981.

References

1925 births
2008 deaths
French Communist Party politicians